The 2017 Cadel Evans Great Ocean Road Race was a road cycling one-day race that took place on 29 January. It was the third edition of the Cadel Evans Great Ocean Road Race and the second event of the 2017 UCI World Tour. It was the first time that the race was included in the UCI World Tour calendar.

In a reduced-field sprint finish,  rider Nikias Arndt won the race ahead of Australians Simon Gerrans and Cameron Meyer, who was riding for a selected Australian national team.

Teams
As a new event to the UCI World Tour, all UCI WorldTeams were invited to the race, but not obligated to compete in the race. As such, thirteen of the eighteen WorldTeams competed in the race. Four UCI Professional Continental teams competed, while an Australian national squad completed the 18-team peloton.

Result

References

External links
 

Cadel Evans Great Ocean Road Race
Cadel Evans Great Ocean Road Race
Cadel Evans Great Ocean Road Race
Cadel Evans Great Ocean Road Race